Jersey is a town in Walton County, Georgia, United States. The population was 146 at the 2020 census.

History
The community was named for the Jersey bull owned by an early settler.

The Georgia General Assembly incorporated Jersey as a town in 1905.

Geography

Jersey is located at  (33.716872, -83.803943).

Demographics

As of the census of 2000, there were 163 people, 61 households, and 45 families residing in the town. The racial makeup of the town was 95.71% White, 3.07% African American, 0.61% from other races, and 0.61% from two or more races. Hispanic or Latino of any race were 0.61% of the population.

There were 61 households, out of which 29.5% had children under the age of 18 living with them, 55.7% were married couples living together, 13.1% had a female householder with no husband present, and 24.6% were non-families. 21.3% of all households were made up of individuals, and 13.1% had someone living alone who was 65 years of age or older. The average household size was 2.67 and the average family size was 3.11.

In the town, the population was spread out, with 24.5% under the age of 18, 10.4% from 18 to 24, 28.8% from 25 to 44, 22.7% from 45 to 64, and 13.5% who were 65 years of age or older. The median age was 37 years. For every 100 females, there were 79.1 males. For every 100 females age 18 and over, there were 89.2 males.

The median income for a household in the town was $21,250, and the median income for a family was $53,750. Males had a median income of $43,750 versus $25,000 for females. The per capita income for the town was $18,295. About 17.0% of families and 20.6% of the population were below the poverty line, including 29.4% of those under the age of eighteen and 21.4% of those 65 or over.

References

Towns in Georgia (U.S. state)
Towns in Walton County, Georgia